Avan Oru Sarithiram is a 1977 Indian Tamil-language film directed by  K. S. Prakash Rao and produced by K. S. Kutralingam. The film stars Sivaji Ganesan, Manjula and Kanchana. It was released on 14 January 1977.

Plot 
Shankar, his brother Muthu, their father Namachivayam, mother, Lakshmi, sister Gowri, betrothed Gomathi all live in a well-to-do happy family. Shankar became collector to fulfill his father's desire while Muthu became a farmer and turns to a revolutionary seeing the atrocities committed by the corrupt politicians and officials. 

Gowri falls in love with Ramu, son of Vedhachalam, a business man who is married for the second time to a young woman and has his father-in-law as his guide. Vedhachalam intends to use his connection to the family to get a few files signed and some properties belonging to the government acquired in his name. The honest upright Shankar insults him causing a rift between the two families. Vedhachalam, having felt insulted, wants to take vengeance by ruining the family. He aims to acquire all the land belonging to Namachivayam to whom his land is as sacred as his own mother. He becomes an M.L.A, uses his influence and gets the land acquired through Shankar in his capacity as collector in the excuse that it is ideal for TB hospital and later subverts the collector and gets it allotted for his purpose. This causes Namachivayam to die and Shankar to resign. He starts a magazine to expose the corrupt nexus above him with the support of Kalpana, Vedhachalam's foreign-educated doctor daughter who cannot bear to see her father's evil activities.

In the end, seeing the influence of Shankar as a journalist grow, he attempts to kill him only to end up killing his own daughter for which he and his cohorts are arrested. Seeing that violence begets violence, Muthu too surrenders.

Cast 
Sivaji Ganesan as Shankar I.A.S, Sub Collector
Manjula as Gomathi, Shankar's lover
Kanchana as Kalpana
T. K.Bhagavathi as Nattamai Namachivayam, Shankar's father
Pandari Bai as Lakshmi, Shankar's mother
Srikanth as Muthu, Shankar's brother
Major Sundarrajan as Head Collector
S. V. Ramadas as Collector Secretary
K. A. Thangavelu, Vedhachalam's uncle
V. K. Ramasamy as Vedhachalam
Manorama, Vedhachalam's Second wife
Cho as Ramu, Vedhachalam's Son
M. Bhanumathi as Gowri, Ramu's wife and Shankar's sister
C. I. D Sakunthala as Dancer
Karuppu Subbiah

Soundtrack 
The music was composed by M. S. Viswanathan. The song "En Manadhu Ondrudhaan" is partially based on "Für Elise" by Ludwig van Beethoven. The song "Vanakkam" is set in the Abhogi raga.

Reception 
Kanthan of Kalki appreciated the cinematography, but criticised the story.

References

External links 
 

1970s Tamil-language films
1977 films
Films directed by K. S. Prakash Rao
Films scored by M. S. Viswanathan